Hans Fritz Scholl (22 September 1918 – 22 February 1943) was, along with Alexander Schmorell, one of the two founding members of the White Rose resistance movement in Nazi Germany. The principal author of the resistance movement's literature, he was found guilty of high treason for distributing anti-Nazi material and was executed by the Nazi regime in 1943 during World War II.

Early life
Scholl was born in Ingersheim on September 22, 1918. (Ingersheim is now a part of Crailsheim, Baden-Württemberg). His father, Robert, later became the mayor of Forchtenberg am Kocher. Hans was the second of six children:

 Inge Aicher-Scholl (1917–1998)
 Hans Scholl (1918–1943)
 Elisabeth Scholl Hartnagel (1920–2020), married Sophie's long-term boyfriend, Fritz Hartnagel
 Sophie Scholl (1921–1943)
 Werner Scholl (1922–1944) missing in action and presumed dead in June 1944
 Thilde Scholl (1925–1926)

Scholl was raised as a Lutheran, although he did at one point consider converting to Catholicism. Against the declared will of his father, he became an enthusiastic member of the Hitler Youth on April 15, 1933 and initially held leadership positions in the Deutsches Jungvolk, but quickly became disillusioned with the group when he realised its true principles. In 1935, he was one of three standard-bearers from Ulm who took part in the NSDAP's "Reich Party Rally for Freedom" from September 10 to 16 in Nuremberg. During this time, his attitude towards the Nazi regime gradually began to change. One reason was that the fanaticism promoted in the Hitler Youth and the unconditional subordination to the power structures ruling there became more and more repugnant.

1937–1938 trial 
Scholl was arrested in 1937–38 because of his membership in a forbidden Youth Movement organisation. Hans Scholl had joined the Deutsche Jungenschaft 1. 11. (d.j.1.11) in 1934, when he and other Hitler Youth members in Ulm considered membership in this group and the Hitler Youth to be compatible.

During the trial, Hans was also charged under “Paragraph 175”, the paragraph in Nazi law that criminalized homosexual behavior. Under questioning, he admitted to having had two separate  relationships, one  with Rolf Futterknecht, and one with Ernest Reden, who had also made advances on his brother Werner. Futterknecht had been the one to inform on Hans.

Hans made a positive impact on the judge, who dismissed the choice to join the youth groups as the “youthful exuberance” and “obstinate personality” of a “headstrong young man.” The judge then dismissed the homosexual allegations as a “youthful failing.” Hans was allowed to leave the trial with a clean slate. Ernest Reden, on the other hand, was sentenced to three months prison and three months in a concentration  camp for the relationship.

After Hans’ trial, no one spoke of the allegations against him. The only people who knew were his parents and his older sister, Inge, who never spoke about the allegations.

Medical studies and Wehrmacht 
In spring of 1937, he joined the Reich Labour Service, having volunteered for duty. He was discharged in March 1939 to attend medical school at the Ludwig Maximilian University of Munich. At the university he came into contact with professors, teachers, and students who represented positions that were clearly Christian-ethical and critical of the regime. Therefore, Hans began to question his own ideological position more critically.

During the semester break, he was drafted as a medic for front service and took the rank of medical sergeant in the French campaign. What he experienced during direct frontline operations reinforced his personal stance against the rulers and the war in particular. Hans was again enrolled in the military service in the spring of 1941 as a medic in the Wehrmacht.

Origins of the White Rose 

Between 1940 and 1941, Scholl, a former member of the Hitler Youth, began questioning the principles and policies of the Nazi regime. As a student at the University of Munich, Scholl met two Roman Catholic men of letters who redirected his life, inspiring him to turn from studying medicine and pursue religion, philosophy, and the arts.

After their experiences at the Eastern Front, having learned about mass murder in Poland and the Soviet Union, Scholl and Alexander Schmorell felt compelled to take action. From the end of June until mid-July 1942, they wrote the first four leaflets. Quoting extensively from the Bible, Aristotle and Novalis, as well as Goethe and Schiller, the German poets, they appealed to what they considered the German intelligentsia, believing that these people would be easily convinced by the same arguments that also motivated the authors themselves. These leaflets were left in telephone books in public phone booths, mailed to professors and students, and taken by courier to other universities for distribution.

From 23 July to 30 October 1942, Willi Graf, Scholl and Schmorell served again at the Soviet front, and activities ceased until their return. After their return, Willi Graf became one of the core members of the White Rose. Sophie was the second to last member to join. By the end of December 1942, Kurt Huber became the last main member of the White Rose.

With six core members, two more White Rose pamphlets were created and circulated over the summer of 1942.

The leaflets were distributed around the Ludwig Maximilian University of Munich, where many of the group members studied. Leaflets were distributed at the University of Hamburg and in the city of Ulm as well. Additionally, leaflets were also mailed to doctors, scholars, and pub owners throughout Germany.

Capture and execution
On 18 February 1943, while Hans and Sophie were distributing leaflets at Ludwig Maximilian University, Sophie flung the last remaining leaflets from the top floor down into the atrium. This spontaneous action was observed by the university maintenance man, Jakob Schmid. Schmid reported the offense and the Scholls were arrested by the Gestapo. Along with Christoph Probst, the two siblings were tried for treason by Judge Roland Freisler. They were found guilty and condemned to death on 22 February.

During his interrogation, Hans tried to protect his sister by claiming to have thrown the leaflets himself, but his testimony was contradicted by the custodian's. He further tried to hide the role played by other members of the White Rose. Hans was well aware of the likely consequence of his actions. 

At the trial, Hans, Sophie, and Christoph were sentenced to death. They were originally scheduled to be hanged in public (work had already begun on the scaffolds) but the officials feared they would be immortalized as martyrs if they were killed in public. As such, a last minute decision was made to switch the execution method to the guillotine.

After the trial, Hans, Christoph, and Sophie were brought to Stadelheim Prison. While there, they were told that they would be executed the same day. This came as a shock to them, as prisoners were supposed to have at least a 99-day respite before execution. Left in separate cells, they began to write their last letters.

While in their cells, Hans, Sophie, and Christoph each saw a priest to give them the last rites of the Catholic Church. Christoph, who was not part of any denomination, asked to be baptized into the Catholic Church. Hans and Sophie each also asked individually to be allowed into the Catholic Church, but their Lutheran priest advised against it, on the basis that it would upset their mother, who was a devout Lutheran.

At around 4-5 pm, Robert and Magdalena Scholl, the parents of Sophie and Hans, went to the prison and demanded to see their children. To their surprise, the request was granted. Robert and Magdalena were led to a room. In a few minutes Hans entered. Dressed in prison uniform, he stood tall as he walked to his parents and grabbed their hands through the barrier separating them. “I have no hatred. I have put everything behind me.” His father replied, “You will go down in history -- there is such a thing as justice.”

After Hans was led out, Sophie was brought in. Dressed in normal clothes, she smiled happily, pleased to see her parents. After speaking for a few minutes, her mother grasped her hands. “You know, Sophie -- Jesus.” “Yes, but you too.” Sophie replied. She walked out of the room, head held high.

A few minutes before the execution, the three of them were allowed to be together for a short while. While there, they were given a cigarette to share. Christoph is credited with remarking, “I didn’t know dying could be so easy.” At around 5 pm, the executioners came for Sophie. After a few minutes, a dull thump was heard. The executioner came for Hans next. Unlike Sophie, who had gone to her death silently, Hans yelled “Es lebe die Freiheit!” as the blade came down. Christoph was the last to be executed. He was unable to see any of his family before he died.

After the trial of Hans, Sophie, and Christoph, three more trials of the White Rose members took place. In the end, 29 people were accused of being members of the White Rose. 16 were executed, and 13 were given prison sentences ranging from 6 months to 10 years.

Legacy

Following the deaths, a copy of the sixth leaflet was smuggled out of Germany through Scandinavia to the UK by German jurist Helmuth James Graf von Moltke, where it was used by the Allied Forces. In July 1943, they dropped millions of copies of the tract, retitled The Manifesto of the Students of Munich, over Germany.

The White Rose's legacy has been considered significant by many historical commentators, both as a demonstration of exemplary spiritual courage, and as a well-documented case of social dissent in a time of violent repression, censorship and pressure to conform.

Playwright Lillian Garrett-Groag stated in Newsday (22 February 1993):
It is possibly the most spectacular moment of resistance that I can think of in the twentieth century... The fact that five little kids, in the mouth of the wolf, where it really counted, had the tremendous courage to do what they did, is spectacular to me. I know that the world is better for them having been there, but I do not know why.

In the same issue of Newsday, Holocaust historian Jud Newborn noted:
You cannot really measure the effect of this kind of resistance in whether or not X number of bridges were blown up or a regime fell... The White Rose really has a more symbolic value, but that's a very important value.

It was not until the 1998 law to abolish Nazi judgments of injustice in the administration of criminal justice that the sentences against Hans Scholl and other members of the White Rose became void in Germany.

In 2003, Germans were invited by television broadcaster ZDF to participate in Unsere Besten (Our Best), a nationwide competition to choose the top ten most important Germans of all time. Voters under the age of 40 helped Scholl and his sisters to finish in fourth place, above Johann Sebastian Bach, Johann Wolfgang von Goethe, Johannes Gutenberg, Otto von Bismarck, Willy Brandt, and Albert Einstein. If the votes of young viewers alone had been counted, Sophie and Hans Scholl would have been ranked first.

The Audimax of the Bundeswehr Medical Academy in Munich was named after Hans Scholl in 2012.

In film
Three films have been produced about the White Rose:

Hans was portrayed by Michael Cornelius in the film Fünf Letze Tage (1982)
Hans was portrayed by Wulf Kessler in the film Die Weisse Rose (1982)
Hans was portrayed by Fabian Hinrichs in the film Sophie Scholl – The Final Days (2005).

See also
 Geschwister-Scholl-Preisa literary prize in honour of the Scholls
 Unsere Besten ("Our Best")a listing of 100+ great Germans

References

External links 

 The White Rose: A Lesson in Dissent by Jacob G. Hornberger
 Text of leaflets in English
 A collaborative, student-led translation of the six printed leaflets by students at the University of Oxford 
 

1918 births
1943 deaths
People from Crailsheim
People from the Kingdom of Württemberg

German Lutherans
Hitler Youth members
Protestants in the German Resistance
Lutheran pacifists
German Christian pacifists
German revolutionaries
White Rose members
Nonviolence advocates
German Army soldiers of World War II
Ludwig Maximilian University of Munich
Executed activists
Executed revolutionaries
Executed students
Executed German Resistance members
People executed by Nazi Germany by guillotine
People from Baden-Württemberg executed by Nazi Germany
Reich Labour Service members
German LGBT people
People executed by Nazi courts